The 1972 Iowa State Cyclones football team represented Iowa State University in the Big Eight Conference during the 1972 NCAA University Division football season. In their fifth and final year under head coach Johnny Majors, the Cyclones compiled a 5–6–1 record (2–4–1 against conference opponents), finished in seventh place in the conference, and outscored opponents by a combined total of 319 to 238. They played their home games at Clyde Williams Field in Ames, Iowa.

George Amundson and Matt Blair were the team captains.

Schedule

Roster

Rankings

Game summaries

at Colorado State 
To open the 1972 season, Iowa State went on the road to shutout the Colorado State Rams 41–0, the first of three games against Western Athletic Conference (WAC) opponents. The first quarter of the game was a stalemate, but the rushing ability of tailback Jerry Moses powered an 86-yard drive that concluded in a four-yard touchdown run on a sneak play by George Amundson in the first minutes of the second quarter. George Amundson completed 12 of 126 passes for 171 yards, throwing three touchdowns and running for another. Don Greenwood, who started at tight end after Keith Krepfle cracked a neck vertebrae during practice the previous week, caught six passes for 80 yards, including a seven-yard touchdown reception. Moses, who gained 66 yards in twelve carries, suffered a knee injury early in the second quarter and was replaced by Mike Strachan, who had 143 yards in seven carries, including a 24-yard run to set up the third Iowa State touchdown. In the final minutes of the blowout, backup quarterback Wayne Stanley came in and ran for 53 yards, including the final touchdown.

Utah 
At its home opener, Iowa State came back from a 14–16 halftime deficit against Utah to score 28 unanswered points, defeating the WAC team 44–22. Amundson ran for two touchdowns and threw to Greenwood for two others.

New Mexico 
In its second home game against a WAC opponent, Iowa State shutout New Mexico 31–0. After its third victory, Iowa State was ranked in the AP Top 20 Poll for the first time in the season.

at Colorado 

Coming off of a bye week, 18th-ranked Iowa State went on the road as a 13-point underdog for its first Big Eight conference game, suffering its first loss against 13th-ranked Colorado, 22–34. The ranked vs. ranked matchup was attended by a sellout crowd of over 51,000, the largest sporting event in the state of Colorado to that date. The Buffaloes gained a 14–0 lead on the first two drives and never let the Cyclones get closer than seven points for the rest of the game. The Cyclones were stymied by penalties on both sides of the ball, with nine for 121 yards, including a defensive offsides on a Buffaloes field goal attempt that kept the Colorado drive alive.

Kansas State 
Iowa State recovered from their loss to Colorado to blow out Kansas State at home 55–22.

at Kansas 

    
    
    
    
    
    

Iowa State went on the road to blow out Kansas 34–8 in the latter's homecoming game. The Cyclones were heavy favorites against the Jayhawks, who were 2–4 but winless in conference play. Kansas quarterback David Jaynes returned from injury for the game.

Oklahoma 

In front of an overflow crowd of over 36,000, Iowa State suffered its first home loss in its homecoming game, falling to two-touchdown favorite No. 7 Oklahoma 6–20. Both offenses were hampered by the muddy turf, soaked from a week of rain due to Iowa State's lack of a tarp. Leon Crosswhite and Greg Pruitt combined for over 200 rush yards to establish the dominant Sooners ball control offense, while the Oklahoma defense held Strachan to 50. The Sooners scored first at the beginning of the second quarter when Crosswhite carried for a touchdown on a drive kept alive by a pair of completions from Dave Robertson to John Carroll. Later in the second quarter, a pair of long runs by Amundson and Strachan brought the Cyclones to the Sooner 20. The Sooners defense stiffened there and Amundson slipped while fading on third down. Goedjen kicked a 38-yard field goal to put the Cyclones on the board with nearly five minutes left. The Sooners then marched down the field but stalled near the goal line in the final seconds of the half. Larry Hunt and Steve Burns tacked Robertson for a loss, forcing the Sooners to settle for a Rick Fulcher field goal to bring their lead to 10–3 at the half. In the final minutes of the fourth quarter, Robertson ran for 55 yards on a third and long to the Cyclone 3-yard line before a Pruitt touchdown run put the game out of reach.

Nebraska 
Iowa State came close to upsetting No. 3 Nebraska at home but tied at 23 instead due to a missed game-ending extra point by kicker Tom Goedjen.

at Missouri 
Iowa State was upset on the road by No. 19 Missouri 5–6. Their only points came on a Goedjen field goal towards the end of the first quarter and a safety on a blocked punt towards the end of the third. After Goedjen missed three field goal attempts, Majors elected to go for it with his team on 4th and goal from the Missouri two-yard line with six minutes left in the 4th quarter. Amundson attempted to run the ball in for the touchdown but was taken down for a loss, and Missouri went on to cap their drive with the game-winning field goal by Greg Hill. Despite their loss, they were invited to the 1972 Liberty Bowl to face Georgia Tech after the other teams being considered for the bowl bid also suffered defeats.

at Oklahoma State 

    
    
    
    
    
    
    
    

Heading to Lewis Field to face the Oklahoma State Cowboys in the Cyclones' conference finale, Majors sought to avoid another embarrassing defeat before the Liberty Bowl. Although the seventeenth-ranked Cyclones were favored by a touchdown, the 5–4 Cowboys were eager to obtain their first winning season since 1959, secure third place in the Big Eight standings, and avenge their 55–0 loss to the Cyclones in the previous season. Despite early-season upsets of bowl-bound Colorado and Missouri teams, the Cowboys, led by first-year head coach Dave Smith, had not received a bowl invitation and desired to prove their fitness for one. Running a wishbone offense, the Cowboys ranked 4th nationally in rushing yards, powered by quarterback Brent Blackman and running backs George Palmer and Fountain Smith.

The Cyclones started hot with a 28-yard completion from Amundson to Moses on the first play of the game, and got a first down at the Cowboys 26 on a 15-yard Strachan run. The game soon went downhill when the Cowboys' Bob Shepard recovered a Larry Marquardt fumble at the Cowboys 22. On second down, the Cowboys ran a prearranged sleeper pass trick play in which they lined up after a quick huddle before Blackman surprised the Cyclones defense with a pass to Tom Stremme, who had not huddled and was uncovered in the flat. Stremme ran for 64 yards before John Schweizer tackled him at the Cyclones 11, saving the touchdown. A Smith run punched the ball in for the touchdown, but Eddie Garrett missed the extra point. Majors challenged the trick play but the referees upheld their decision. Three plays after the kickoff, Amundson lost the ball when he was hit by Doug Tarrant and it was recovered by Jay Cruse who returned it to the Cyclones 4. Alton Gerard punched the ball in for a touchdown and Blackman converted on a run to put the Cowboys up 14–0 in the first five minutes of the game.

Iowa State rallied after Steve Burns recovered a Palmer fumble on the Cyclones 39 and marched 61 yards in 13 plays down the field to score on an Amundson screen pass to Krepfle towards the end of the first quarter. Another Cowboys fumble, this time by Smith, was recovered by Ted Jornov near midfield, allowing the Cyclones drive 51 yards in seven plays to tie the game with a 25-yard touchdown pass from Amundson to Willie Jones in the first minute of the second quarter. However, Amundson was picked off by Lee Stover halfway through the quarter, giving the Cowboys offense starting field position at the Cyclone 39. Overcoming two illegal procedure penalties, the Cowboys drove in on a Palmer run for a 21–14 halftime lead after Blackman lateraled to Smith for a large gain. The third quarter was scoreless, but in the fourth the Cowboys exploded for 24 points on a Palmer touchdown run, a Garrett field goal, an Alfred Nelms touchdown run, and a Blackman touchdown run to seal their 45–14 victory. With the blowout loss, the Cyclones fell to sixth in the conference and were dropped from both polls.

at San Diego State 
In the final regular season game, Iowa State was upset on the road 14–27 by Pacific Coast Athletic Association champions San Diego State, who were 22-point underdogs. The momentum of the game shifted on the first play of the fourth quarter when a 45-yard Goedjen field goal attempt was blocked by Joe Lavender and returned for a touchdown by Bill Ferguson, tying the game at 14.  Phil Danowsky returned the kickoff but fumbled the ball, which was recovered by Ken Jackson to give San Diego State excellent field position at the Iowa State 39-yard line. In three plays, San Diego State quarterback Jesse Freitas passed to Isaac Curtis for the touchdown, giving the Aztecs a 21–14 lead. The Aztecs clinched their victory with 4:56 left in the game after Rick Ash intercepted Amundson on the Iowa State 30, and Frank Miller ran for a 1-yard touchdown in four plays to finish the San Diego State scoring drive. The Cyclones thus finished the regular season with a 5–5–1 record.

References

Iowa State
Iowa State Cyclones football seasons
Iowa State Cyclones football